is a Japanese voice actor who was born in Taketa, Ōita.

Notable voice roles
Seishiro Sakurazuka in X/1999 the series
Gain Bijo in Overman King Gainer
Bougan man in Samurai 7
Ikazuchi no Takamaru in Onmyou Taisenki
Ryūjirō Sasaki in Samurai Champloo
Kaiden Bugster (ep. 21, 24, 37) in Kamen Rider Ex-Aid

External links
 
 

1965 births
Living people
Japanese male voice actors
Male voice actors from Ōita Prefecture